"" ("King's Song") is Norway's royal anthem. The lyrics come in several versions. The first version ("") was written by N. Vogtmann around 1800, but the version used today and quoted below was written by Gustav Jensen for the coronation of Haakon VII and Maud of Wales in 1906 and later used in his Landstads reviderte salmebok. It was inspired by the British royal and national anthem and set to the tune of "God Save the King"; Henrik Wergeland wrote a translation of "God Save the King" in 1841, dedicated to King Carl Johan of Norway and Sweden.

Lyrics

Notes

References 

National symbols of Norway
Norwegian monarchy
Norwegian anthems
Royal anthems
God Save the King